Josiomorpha is a genus of moths in the subfamily Arctiinae described by Felder in 1874.

Species
Josiomorpha cathetozosta Becker, 2013
Josiomorpha penetrata (Walker, [1865])
Josiomorpha triangulifera Hering, 1925

References

External links

Arctiinae